David Caballero-García (born 14 November 1974) is a former professional tennis player from Spain.

Biography
Caballero, who comes from Molina de Segura in the Murcia region of Spain, began competing on the professional tennis tour in 1992.

A right-handed player, Caballero featured in the main draw of one ATP Tour tournament, the 1997 Croatia Open Umag. Playing as a qualifier in the singles draw he won his first round match over Orlin Stanoytchev, before losing in the round of 16 to eventual champion Félix Mantilla. He also competed in the doubles main draw with Juan Antonio Marin, to make the quarter-finals.

He reached his best singles ranking of 195 in the world in 1998.

References

External links
 
 

1974 births
Living people
Spanish male tennis players
Tennis players from the Region of Murcia